Irina-Camelia Begu was the defending champion, but lost in the quarterfinals against Garbiñe Muguruza.

María-Teresa Torró-Flor won the title defeating Garbiñe Muguruza in the final 6–3, 4–6, 6–4.

Seeds

Draw

Finals

Top half

Bottom half

References 
Main Draw
Qualifying Draw

BCR Open Romania Ladies - Singles
BCR Open Romania Ladies